David John Shrigley  (born 17 September 1968) is a British visual artist. He lived and worked in Glasgow, Scotland for 27 years before moving to Brighton, England in 2015. Shrigley first came to prominence in the 1990s for his distinct line drawings, which often deal with witty, surreal and darkly humorous subject matter and are rendered in a rough, almost childlike style. Alongside his illustration work, Shrigley is also a noted painter, sculptor, filmmaker and photographer, and has recorded spoken word albums of his writing and poetry.

Early life and education
Shrigley was born 17 September 1968 in Macclesfield, Cheshire. He moved with his parents and sister to Oadby, Leicestershire when he was two years old. He took the Art and Design Foundation course at Leicester Polytechnic in 1987, and then studied environmental art at Glasgow School of Art from 1988 to 1991. Talking about his final degree show, Shrigley later told The Guardian'''s Becky Barnicoat, "I thought my degree show was brilliant, but the people who were marking it didn't. I got a 2:2. They didn't appreciate my genius.[…] I didn't sell anything at the show – it was 1991, before the YBAs. There wasn't a precedent for people selling work that wasn't figurative painting". Before becoming a full-time artist, Shrigley worked as a gallery guide at the CCA in Glasgow, where he would use the gallery's equipment to self-publish a series of books of his drawings.

Work

As well as authoring several books, he directed the video for Blur's "Good Song" and also for Bonnie 'Prince' Billy's "Agnes, Queen of Sorrow". In 2005 he designed a London Underground leaflet cover. Since 2005, he has contributed a cartoon for The Guardians Weekend magazine every Saturday. Other projects have included the album Worried Noodles (Tom Lab, 2007) where musicians interpret his writings as lyrics, including collaborations by David Byrne, Hot Chip, and Franz Ferdinand. 
 
Shrigley co-directed a short film with director Chris Shepherd called Who I Am And What I Want (2005), based on Shrigley's book of the same title, with Kevin Eldon voicing its main character, Pete. Shrigley also produced a series of drawings and t-shirt designs for the 2006 Triptych festival, a Scottish music festival lasting for three to four days in three cities. He also designed twelve different covers for Deerhoof's 2007 record, Friend Opportunity. In the same year he also designed the title sequence for the film Hallam Foe, as well as the drawings and the writing in Hallam's on-screen diaries. 

In 2014, Jonathan Jones reviewed Shrigley's work Brass Tooth, writing, "David Shrigley must have had a big, toothy grin when he created multiple editions of his sculpture Brass Tooth, which goes on sale for £1,200 a pop at the London art fair this week. It is a cast of a single tooth – including the roots – and is typical of Shrigley's sly, subversive, humorous art in how it brings a modern art cliche crashing down to Earth".

In 2015, he designed "Kingsley", a mascot for Scottish football team Partick Thistle as part of a sponsorship deal. The mascot's design was the object of some amusement, with Scottish BuzzFeed reporter Jamie Ross describing it as "based on every nightmare I had as a child."

Shrigley also undertook a residency at Auckland's Two Rooms in 2015, during which he painted for the first time since his graduation from The Glasgow School of Art in 1991. He said that the residency presented ‘an opportunity to explore a different medium and explore what you can do with “that” versus what you do with “this”.'

Shrigley's sculpture Really Good was installed on Trafalgar Square's Fourth plinth between September 2016 and March 2018. He was granted £130,000 by the London mayor's office to make the work. Shrigley has said "I don't think I'll ever get to do anything that meant more to me".

In 2019, he designed the yellow and red card of the AS Velasca.

Shrigley was appointed Officer of the Order of the British Empire (OBE) in the 2020 New Year Honours for services to visual arts.

Exhibitions
In 2020, Shrigley released a body of work entitled 'Lockdown Drawings'. 340 pieces of art inspired by the UK's coronavirus lockdown in spring 2020 were displayed in the Stephen Friedman Gallery.

Recent notable solo exhibitions include Do Not Touch the Worms, Copenhagen Contemporary, Denmark (2020); Exhibition of Inflatable Swan Things, Spritmuseum, Stockholm, Sweden (2018); David Shrigley, Hall Art Foundation, Reading, Vermont, USA (2017); Life Model II,  Rose Art Museum, Waltham, Mass., USA (2016); David Shrigley: Life and Life Drawing, National Gallery of Victoria, Melbourne, Australia (2014); David Shrigley: Brain Activity, YBCA, San Francisco (2012) Animate, Turku Art Museum, Finland (2011); Kelvingrove Museum, Glasgow International Festival of Visual Arts, Glasgow, Scotland (2010); New Powers, Kunsthalle Mainz, Germany (2009); David Shrigley, Museum Ludwig, Cologne, Germany (2008); Baltic Centre for Contemporary Art, Gateshead, UK (2008); Everything Must Have a Name, Malmö Konsthall, Malmo, Sweden (2007) and David Shrigley, Dundee Contemporary Arts, Dundee, Scotland (2006).

Jason Mraz took the name of his album We Sing. We Dance. We Steal Things. from a work by Shrigley.

In January 2016, Shrigley's work was part of a British Council-organised international touring exhibition. Previewing the touring David Shrigley: Lose Your Mind exhibition before it opened in Guadalajara, Mexico, BBC Arts said: "Best known for his crudely composed and mordantly humorous cartoons, David Shrigley is a highly popular British artist […] Featuring works as diverse as cartoonish ceramic boots, doodle-like drawings and a headless, stuffed ostrich, the exhibition highlights Shrigley's lively, irreverent imagination in full flow". In the same month, he contributed to the Liverpool Provocations event in Liverpool's city centre.

PublicationsThis Is A Paper Trinket For You To WearHow Are You FeelingTo Make Meringue You MustMan in a RoomDo Not BendThe Book of ShrigleyAnts Have Sex in Your BeerSlug TrailsMerry EczemaBlanket of FilthEnquire WithinLet Not These Shadows Fall Upon TheeErrDrawings Done Whilst on the Phone To IdiotWhy We Got The Sack From The MuseumCentre PartingOrder of ServiceTo Make Meringue You Must Beat The Egg Whites Until They Look Like ThisBlank Page And Other PagesThe Beast Is NearHard WorkLeotardJoyYellow Bird With WormHuman AchievementWho I Am And What I WantLet's WrestleRulesKill Your PetsIt Is ItBlocked PathPhotographs with TextWorried Noodles – The Empty SleeveHandRed BookWhat The Hell Are You Doing? The Essential David ShrigleyFragments of Torn Up DrawingsWeak Messages Create Bad SituationsMusic
In 2006, Shrigley's first spoken word album Shrigley Forced to Speak With Others was released by Azuli Records, under their Late Night Tales label.
In October 2007, Tomlab released Worried Noodles, a double CD of artists including David Byrne, Islands, Liars, Grizzly Bear, Mount Eerie, R. Stevie Moore and Final Fantasy putting Shrigley's 2005 book of the same name to music. Moore went on to record an entire album of new songs set to Shrigley's Worried Noodles lyrics called Shrigley Field''.

Awards
Shrigley was nominated for the 2013 Turner Prize. He was awarded an honorary doctorate by Leicester's De Montfort University at a ceremony on 17 July 2014.

References

External links
 

1968 births
Living people
People from Macclesfield
People from Oadby
Alumni of De Montfort University
Alumni of the Glasgow School of Art
English contemporary artists
Officers of the Order of the British Empire